Dumplin is the soundtrack album by American country music singer-songwriter Dolly Parton for the 2018 film of the same name. It was released on November 30, 2018, by Dolly Records and RCA Nashville. The album features guest performances by Elle King, Alison Krauss, Miranda Lambert, Sia, Mavis Staples and Rhonda Vincent, among others.

"Girl in the Movies" received a nomination for Best Original Song at the 2019 Golden Globes.

Release and promotion
The album was announced on September 12, 2018, along with its lead single, "Here I Am", which was released on September 14. A music video for "Here I Am" was released on November 2 via Parton's Vevo channel.

On October 22, 2018, Parton revealed the album’s cover art and track listing, as well as announcing that the album would be available for pre-order on November 2 and that the second single, "Girl in the Movies", would be available the same day. The music video for "Girl in the Movies" was released on November 19 via Parton's Vevo channel.

The New String Version of "Jolene" was released as the third single from the album on November 16, 2018. The music video, featuring footage from the Dolly & Friends: The Making of a Soundtrack special, was released on November 26.

On November 25, Parton began posting  15-second snippets of songs from the album on Twitter, beginning with "Why". This was followed by "Two Doors Down" on November 26, "If We Don't" on November 27, and "Dumb Blonde" on November 28.

On November 29, 2018, CMT aired a television special titled Dolly & Friends: The Making of a Soundtrack, which featured a behind the scenes look at the recording of the album.

Parton promoted the album with an appearance on NBC's Today on November 30, where she was interviewed and performed "Girl in the Movies". She was also interviewed on Today with Kathie Lee and Hoda the same day. That evening she appeared on The Tonight Show Starring Jimmy Fallon, where she performed a medley of Christmas songs with Fallon, in addition to being interviewed and performing "Girl in the Movies".

Content
Six of the songs on the album are new versions of songs Parton had previously recorded.
"Here I Am" was previously recorded for the 1971 album Coat of Many Colors.
"Holdin' on to You" was previously recorded for the 1977 album New Harvest...First Gathering.
"Dumb Blonde" was previously recorded for the 1967 album Hello, I'm Dolly.
"Here You Come Again" was previously recorded for the 1977 album of the same name.
"Two Doors Down" was previously recorded for the 1977 album Here You Come Again. Parton would re-record the song for its 1978 single release. This re-recorded version replaced the original on all subsequent releases of the album.
"Jolene" has been previously recorded by Parton six times. Originally recorded for the 1974 album of the same name, Parton re-recorded the song in 1995 for her album Something Special. Parton also provided vocals on Mindy Smith’s 2004 recording for her album One Moment More. Parton was featured on Straight No Chaser’s 2013 recording of the song for their album Under the Influence. In 2014 Parton was featured on Mary Sarah’s recording for her album Bridges. Pentatonix recorded a Grammy-winning cover of the song featuring Parton in 2016 and included it on their 2017 EP PTX, Vol. IV – Classics.

Commercial performance
The album's first single, "Here I Am", was released in September 2018 and peaked at No. 37 on the US Billboard Hot Country Songs chart. The album has sold 23,200 copies in the United States as of March 2019.

Track listing
{{Track listing
| headline = ''Dumplin track listing
| title1          = Here I Am
| note1           = with Sia
| writer1         = Dolly Parton
| length1         = 4:32
| title2          = Holdin' on to You 
| note2           = with Elle King
| writer2         = Parton
| length2         = 3:27
| title3          = Girl in the Movies
| writer3         = 
| length3         = 4:34
| title4          = Red Shoes
| writer4         = 
| length4         = 2:58
| title5          = Why
| note5           = with Mavis Staples
| writer5         = Parton
| length5         = 2:29
| title6          = Dumb Blonde
| note6           = with Miranda Lambert
| writer6         = Curly Putman
| length6         = 2:34
| title7          = Here You Come Again
| note7           = with Willa Amai
| writer7         = 
| length7         = 3:28
| title8          = Who
| writer8         = 
| length8         = 2:37
| title9          = Push and Pull
| note9           = with Jennifer Aniston and Danielle Macdonald
| writer9         = 
| length9         = 3:33
| title10         = If We Don't
| note10          = with Rhonda Vincent and Alison Krauss
| writer10        = 
| length10        = 2:28
| title11         = Two Doors Down
| note11          = with Macy Gray and Dorothy
| writer11        = Parton
| length11        = 4:06
| title12         = Jolene
| note12          = New String Version
| writer12        = Parton
| length12        = 3:20
| total_length    = 40:06
}}

Personnel
Adapted from the album liner notes.

 Chris Allgood - mastering assistant
 Willa Amai - vocals, piano
 David Angell - violins
 Jennifer Aniston - background vocals
 Sean Badum - string and horn recording assistant, engineering assistant
 Avery Bright - violas
 Billy Bish - mixing
 David Davidson - violins
 Allen Ditto - mixing assistant
 DOROTHY - vocals
 Luke Edgemon - background vocals
 Luis Flores - engineering assistant
 Damon Fox - piano, B3 organ, electric guitar, acoustic guitar, keys
 David Goodstein - drums
 Macy Gray - vocals
 Barry Green - trombone
 Rob Tshaya - album cover photo
 Austin Hoke - cellos, string arrangements
 Jim Hoke - string arrangement, tenor sax, arranger, horn arrangements
 Elle King - vocals
 Alison Krauss - fiddle
 Betsy Lamb - viola
 Miranda Lambert - vocals
 Emily Lazar - mastering
 Briana Lee - background vocals
 Sam Levine - baritone sax
 Danielle Macdonald - background vocals
 John McBride - string and horn recording, mixing, engineering
 Billy Mohler - bass
 Emily Nelson - cellos
 Dolly Parton - lead vocals, executive producer
 Steve Patrick - trumpet
 Linda Perry - producer, engineer, acoustic guitar, background vocals
 Eli Pearl - electric guitar, acoustic guitar, pedal steel guitar
 Cheryl Riddle - hair
 JB Rowland - packaging design
 Sia - vocals
 Mavis Staples - vocals
 Steve Summers - wardrobe design
 Maiya Sykes - background vocals
 Rhonda Vincent - mandolin
 Lisa Vitale - background vocals
 Kristen Weber - violins
 Katelyn Westergard - violins
 Kristin Wilkinson - violas

ChartsAlbumSingles'''

References

2018 soundtrack albums
Comedy film soundtracks
Single-artist film soundtracks